Jelica Kurjak (born 1952 in Belgrade) is a Serbian diplomat and the former Ambassador Extraordinary and Plenipotentiary of the Republic of Serbia to the Russian Federation.

References

External links 
  Jelica Kurjak's personal website

1952 births
Living people
Serbian women diplomats
Ambassadors of Serbia to Russia
Diplomats from Belgrade
Serbian women ambassadors